The Fine Arts Journal, published in Chicago from 1899 to 1919, was an art magazine devoted to the fine arts and increasingly to the arts in the broadest sense. The editor to 1905 was Marian A. White, who sought to make the journal a vehicle "to promote and foster a love for art American in type and the work of the American artist in particular", but resigned when she felt the publisher was insisting that it be a "write-up periodical". From 1907 it was adopted as the official publication of the National Art Society, also based in Chicago.

Editors
 Marian A. White (1899-1905)
 Evelyn M. Stuart (1905-1910)
 James William Pattison (1910-1915)

References

Visual arts magazines published in the United States
Monthly magazines published in the United States
Defunct magazines published in the United States
English-language magazines
Magazines established in 1899
Magazines disestablished in 1919
Magazines published in Chicago